Sitaro Islands Regency (although its formal name is Kabupaten Kepulauan Siau Tagulandang Biaro) is a regency located off the northern extremity of Sulawesi Island in the southern Sangihe Islands, North Sulawesi Province, Indonesia. The regency was formed under Law Number 15 Year 2007 from 2 January 2007, by separation from the Sangihe Islands Regency of which it had previously formed the southern part. The short form of the name is formed from the those of the three principal islands — Siau, Tagulandang and Biaro.

The main island is Siau, while further south (nearer Sulawesi) are Tagulandang and Biaro. The regency's area is 275.95 km2 and the total population was 63,801 at the 2010 census and 71,817 at the 2020 census. Most of the population are fishermen and farmers. The religion of the majority of the population is Christianity and Catholicism, but there are also followers of Islam and Buddhism. The main town and administrative centre is Ulu Siau.

Administrative districts 
The regency is divided into ten districts (kecamatan), tabulated below with their areas and 2010 census and 2020 census populations. The table also includes the locations of the district administrative centres, the number of administrative villages (rural desa and urban kelurahan) in each district, and its postal codes.

Notes: (a) including 20 small offshore islands. (b) including the offshore islands of Pulau Ruang (fourth largest in the regency), Pulau Pasige and 2 smaller. (c) includes the small offshore island of Pulau Batuguhita. (d) includes the offshore islands of Pulau Makaleki and the small Pulau Batuhasaho. (e) including the offshore islands of Pulau Pahepa, Pulau Gunatin, Pulau Mahoro and 13 smaller. (f) includes the offshore islands of Pulau Batupuki Sewenahe and Pulau Timuhe.

Climate
Ondong, the seat of the regency has a tropical rainforest climate (Af) with heavy to very heavy rainfall year-round.

References

Regencies of North Sulawesi